James Francis (1819–1884) was an Australian colonial politician.

James Francis may also refer to:

James B. Francis (1815–1892), British-American engineer 
James Francis (American football) (born 1968), former linebacker in the NFL
Jim Francis (1910–2004), Australian rules footballer and coach
James Francis, one of the members of the band Panic Lift

See also
 Francis James (disambiguation)
 James Francis Murphy (disambiguation)